Puccinia aristidae is a plant pathogen that causes rust on Aristida, spinach and primula.

See also
 List of Puccinia species

References

aristidae
Fungi described in 1893
Fungal plant pathogens and diseases
Leaf vegetable diseases